"Git" (Turkish: Go) is a song from Candan Erçetin's sixth studio album Kırık Kalpler Durağında. The song's lyrics were written by Cemal Safi and composed by Erçetin. It is arranged by Alper Erinç. The third music video of the album was shot for "Git" in 2011, directed by Bozkurt Bayer and Cihangir Ateşağaoğlu.

Track listing 
Album version
 "Git" – 4:26

Personnel 
 Writer – Cemal Safi
 Composer – Candan Erçetin
 Arrangement, guitar – Alper Erinç
 Violin – Nedim Nalbantoğlu
 Percussion – Mehmet Akatay
 Production – Pasaj Müzik

Credits adapted from Kırık Kalpler Durağındas album booklet.

In the media 
The song was featured on Beyaz Show, with altered lyrics by Turkish comedian Beyazıt Öztürk. Erçetin responded to this video and started a long-running debate with Beyaz.

The original video features Erçetin driving a car, talking about a breakup. Beyaz's altered version replaced him into passenger seat and replying to her with his excuses. He apologizes with some French accent, since Erçetin is known for her French covers and album.

Erçetin responded to video by invading Beyaz Show's studio and seizing the studio. She also uses some French accent in response. On 26 December 2014, Beyaz responded to Erçetin asking her to return the couch. A group of male audience also supports him.

After first responses, the debate gained higher popularity and several Turkish musicians, actors and comedians joined in debate videos. On 9 January 2015, Erçetin responded from her house in a tea party with her female supporters Demet Akbağ, Saba Tümer, Esra Erol, Derya Şensoy and Gupse Özay. She mockingly tells in the video that the channel management is discussing to cancel Beyaz Show, which is running about 20 years, and replacing it with a documentary. She ends the response with a rhyme, which contains much letter "r", referring to Beyaz's disability to pronounce the letter correctly.

One week later, on 16 January, Beyaz responded with his male supporters İhsan Varol, Hayko Cepkin, Mustafa Üstündağ, Mansur Ark, Emre Karayel and Nuri Alço. Later Ümit Besen shows up and the debate briefly turns from "Git" to Besen's song "Nikah Masası". They also uses "Hacı Aga (Tavukları Pişirmişem)" for response.

On 23 January 2015, Erçetin make her final response with a group of elder women as "mothers". Beyaz's previous supporters İhsan Varol, Hayko Cepkin, Mustafa Üstündağ and Emre Karayel videoshopped as kids, while the mothers grounding them. Later Emel Sayın joins Erçetin and advises her to make peace with Beyaz. She briefly sings "Mavi Boncuk", which the song advises one to be friends with everyone. Footballer Demba Ba also briefly appears. Mazhar Alanson, Fuat Güner, Özkan Uğur, Ata Demirer, Cem Yılmaz and Yılmaz Erdoğan also tells Erçetin to forgive Beyaz. The second part of the response aired live with Erçetin on Beyaz Show. They sing together and reconcile to end the debate.

On 5 June 2015, long after the debate ended, Beyaz restarted the debate on Beyaz Show season finale.

References

External links 
 Original music video
 Beyaz's altered version

Candan Erçetin songs
2009 songs